The Al-Shams was an anti-Bangladesh paramilitary wing of several Islamist parties in East Pakistan composed of local Bengalis and Muhajirs that along with the Pakistan Army and the Al-Badr, is accused of conducting a mass killing campaign against Bengali nationalists, civilians, religious and ethnic minorities during 1971. The group was banned by the independent government of Bangladesh, but most of its members had fled the country during and after the Bangladesh Liberation War, which led to Bangladesh's independence.

Naming and inspirations
Al-Shams is an Arabic word meaning 'The Sun' and also the name of a Surah in the Quran, Surat Ash-Shams. Al Shams and Al-Badr were local Bengali and Bihari armed groups formed by the Pakistan Army which were mostly recruited from the student wing of Jamaat-e-Islami to fight out and resist Mukti Bahini.

Background
On 25 March 1971, after Operation Searchlight, the exiled leadership of what is now Bangladesh declared independence from Pakistan and armed struggle against the Pakistani Army began. This struggle was spearheaded by elements of Mukti Bahini with strong support from India. As most of the locals were in support of Mukti Bahini and those who were not were killed by Mukti Bahini, the Pakistani Army, composed largely of elements from Punjab, found itself and its cause pretty much alienated from the local populace.

To counter this situation, the Pakistan Army accepted help from Islamic fundamentalist parties including Jamaat-e-Islami, proclaiming Jihad against Indians, to seek unity among the population for the two wings of Pakistan, in the name of religion. The PPP played an active role in its formation. It also recruited from the Urdu speaking Bihari population of East-Pakistan. This was between the Pakistani Army and the liberation forces and their supporters (Indians and Mukti Bahini). To recruit the local populace into fighting the independence movement, two sister organisations Al Badr (literally meaning The Moon, but also has a reference to the famous Battle of Badr) and Al Shams were formed.

Activities
The organisations was supported by local wing of Jamaat-e-Islam Pakistan who declared it a Jihad. The organisation worked as the local guides for Pakistan Army supporting the troops providing logistics and information. It arrested suspects and transported them to interrogation centres that used torture. It carried out looting, rape and violence on the civilian population.

According to witnesses before the International Crimes Tribunal, the Al Shams was under the command of Fazlul Quader Chowdhury and led on the ground by his son Salauddin Quader Chowdhury in Chittagong. The other important members were former M.P. Syed Wahidul Alam of Bangladesh Nationalist Party and Saifuddin Quader Chowdhury, the younger brother of Saluddin Quader Chowdhury. They used to patrol the neighbourhoods of Satkania, Rauzan, Boalkhali, Patia and Rangunia in a jeep. They would set fire to Hindu houses and arrest anybody they suspected of being supportive towards the Mukti Bahini. The suspects were taken to Salauddin Quader Chowdhury's residence Goods Hill, which had been converted to a torture cell, where they were tortured and killed. Their bodies were disposed of in the Karnafuli.

On 12 December, the Al Shams and the Al Badr leadership jointly prepared the blueprint for killing the intellectuals. The Al Shams and Al Badar leadership met with Major General Rao Farman Ali and finalised the blueprint.

Abolition
The general surrender of 16 December 1971 culminates all armed resistance from Pakistani side and the two organisations ceased to exist.

See also 
 Razakars
 Peace Committee

References

Bangladesh Liberation War
Far-right politics in Pakistan
Bangladesh Jamaat-e-Islami
Former paramilitary forces of Pakistan